John Fabyan Parrott (August 8, 1767July 9, 1836) was a United States representative and a Senator from New Hampshire.

He was born in Portsmouth in the Province of New Hampshire to John Parrott, a merchant and ship captain, and his wife Deborah Walker. He followed his father's line of work and began trading in Europe and the Caribbean, something which stopped with the passing of the Embargo Act of 1807. Parrott was a member of the New Hampshire House of Representatives from 1809 to 1814 and also held various local offices. He was an unsuccessful candidate for election in 1812 to the Thirteenth Congress, but was elected to the U.S. House of Representatives for the Fifteenth Congress, serving from March 4, 1817 to March 3, 1819.  He was then elected to the U.S. Senate and served from March 4, 1819 to March 3, 1825. He was a Democratic Republican (later Adams-Clay Republican).

Later, in 1826, he was the postmaster of Portsmouth. He was also a member of the New Hampshire Senate from 1830 to 1831. He died in Greenland, New Hampshire and was interred in the family burying ground on the Parrott estate. His papers are kept at the University of North Carolina.

His sons included Robert Parker Parrott and Peter Pearse Parrott.

References 

1767 births
1836 deaths
Members of the New Hampshire House of Representatives
New Hampshire state senators
United States senators from New Hampshire
New Hampshire postmasters
Democratic-Republican Party United States senators
Democratic-Republican Party members of the United States House of Representatives from New Hampshire